Hexapla ("sixfold") is the term for a critical edition of the Hebrew Bible in six versions, four of them translated into Greek, preserved only in fragments. It was an immense and complex word-for-word comparison of the original Hebrew Scriptures with the Greek Septuagint translation and with other Greek translations. The term especially and generally applies to the edition of the Old Testament compiled by the theologian and scholar Origen, sometime before 240.

The subsisting fragments of partial copies have been collected in several editions, that of Frederick Field (1875) being the most fundamental on the basis of Greek and Syrian testimonies. The surviving fragments are now being re-published (with additional materials discovered since Field's edition) by an international group of Septuagint scholars. This work is being carried out as The Hexapla Project under the auspices of the International Organization for Septuagint and Cognate Studies, and directed by Peter J. Gentry (Southern Baptist Theological Seminary), Alison G. Salvesen (Oxford University), and Bas ter Haar Romeny (Leiden University).

History 

Origen began to study biblical Hebrew in his youth; forced to relocate to Palestine during the persecution of Christianity in Alexandria, he went into biblical textology and by the 240s he commented on virtually all books of the Old and New Testaments. His method of working with the biblical text was described in a message to Sextus Julius Africanus (c. 240) and a commentary on the Gospel of Matthew:

Origen, in his Commentary of the Gospel of Matthew, explained the purpose for creating the Hexapla: 
due to discrepancies between the manuscripts of the Old Testament, with God's help, we were able to overcome using the testimony of other editions. This is because these points in the Septuagint, which because of discrepancies found in [other] manuscripts had given occasion for doubt, we have evaluated on the basis of these other editions, and marked with an obelus those places that were missing in the Hebrew text [...] while others have added the asterisk sign where it was apparent that the lessons were not found in the Septuagint; we have added the other, consistent with the text of the Hebrew editions.

Structure 
The text of the Hexapla was organized in the form of six columns representing synchronized versions of the same Old Testament text, which placed side by side were the following:

the Hebrew consonantal text
the Secunda – the Hebrew text transliterated into Greek characters including vowels
the translation of Aquila of Sinope into Greek (2nd century)
the translation of Symmachus the Ebionite into Greek (late 2nd century)
a recension of the Septuagint, with (1) interpolations to indicate where the Hebrew is not represented in the Septuagint (taken mainly from Theodotion's text and marked with asterisks), and (2) indications, using signs called obeloi (singular: obelus), of where words, phrases, or occasionally larger sections in the Septuagint do not reflect any underlying Hebrew
the translation of Theodotion into Greek (mid 2nd century)

At the end of his life Origen prepared a separate work called Tetrapla (a synoptic set of four Greek translations), placing the Septuagint alongside the translations of Symmachus, Aquila and Theodotion. Both Hexapla and Tetrapla are found in Greek manuscripts of the Septuagint, as well as manuscripts of the Syro-hexaplar version. However, in a number of cases, the names of "Hexapla" and "Octapla" (in the Book of Job from the manuscripts of the Syro-Hexapla and the hexaplar Psalms) are also applied to the work of Origen. This caused a discussion in its time about whether these were separate works.  According to Eusebius of Caesarea, the Hexapla contained three more translations of the Greek Psalms (Quinta, Sexta and Septima), which, however, have not been preserved (for a total of 9 columns, a so-called Enneapla).

According to Epiphanius, the original Hexapla compiled by Origen had a total of eight columns and included two other anonymous Greek translations, one of which was discovered in wine jars in Jericho during the reign of Caracalla. The so-called "fifth" and "sixth editions" were two other Greek translations supposedly discovered by students outside the towns of Jericho and Nicopolis: these were later added by Origen to his Hexapla to make the Octapla.

See also 

 Complutensian Polyglot Bible
 On Weights and Measures (Epiphanius)
 Frederick Field

References

Literature 
 Felix Albrecht: Art. Hexapla of Origen, in: The Encyclopedia of the Bible and Its Reception 11, Berlin et al. 2015, cols. 1000–1002.
 Alison Salvesen (Hrsg.): Origen's hexapla and fragments. Papers presented at the Rich Seminar on the Hexapla, Oxford Centre for Hebrew and Jewish Studies, 25th July – 3rd August 1994 (= Texts and studies in ancient Judaism. Bd. 58). Mohr Siebeck, Tübingen 1998, .
 John Daniel Meade, A Critical Edition of the Hexaplaric Fragments of Job 22-42, Origen’s Hexapla: A Critical Edition of the Extant Fragments (Leuven: Peeters, 2020).
 Erich Klostermann: Analecta zur Septuaginta, Hexapla und Patristik. Deichert, Leipzig 1895.
 Frederick Field (ed.): Origenis hexaplorum quae supersunt: sive veterum interpretum Graecorum in totum vetus testamentum fragmenta. Post Flaminium nobilium, Drusium, et Montefalconium, adhibita etiam versione Syro-Hexaplari. 2 vols. Oxford: Clarendon Press, 1875 (vol. 1: Genesis – Esther. ; vol. 2: Hiob – Maleachi. ).
Anthony Grafton and Megan Williams, Christianity and the Transformation of the Book: Origen, Eusebius, and the Library of Caesarea. Cambridge, MA: Harvard University Press, 2006.
John Johnson, Hexapla from the Lexham Bible Dictionary, 2013.

Jewish Encyclopedia: Origen: His "Hexapla"

External links
Full scan of Origen of Alexandria, Hexapla Vol I
Full scan of Origen of Alexandria, Hexapla Vol II
 A Hexapla's mss
 Another Hexapla's mss

3rd-century Christian texts
Lost religious texts
Early versions of the Bible
Works by Origen
Christian terminology
Polyglot bibles
Translations into Greek